The National Roads Project is a large Egyptian infrastructure project initiated by President Abdel Fattah el-Sisi in August 2014. The project includes the construction of 39 new roadways with a total length of 4,400 km. The new road network will account for around 10% of the total length of all roads in Egypt. The project is expected to be completed within 2 years and cost £E36 billion.

Among the planned roads are the Ismailia-Banha (33 km), the Sohag-Red Sea Road (180 km) and the Wadi al-Natrun-Alamein (134 km).

References

Roads in Egypt